Ryan Gibson (born 30 December 1993) is an Australian cricketer. He made his List A debut for Cricket Australia XI in the 2016–17 Matador BBQs One-Day Cup on 1 October 2016. He scored a century and was named man of the match.

Domestic career
He made his first-class debut for New South Wales in the 2016–17 Sheffield Shield season on 4 November 2016. He made his Twenty20 (T20) debut for Sydney Thunder in the 2016–17 Big Bash League season on 20 December 2016.

Gibson played for New South Wales in the 2017–18 JLT One-Day Cup. He scored his only fifty for the tournament against Cricket Australia XI in the 11th match. He played five matches but only managed to score 93 runs at an average of 18.60.

References

External links
 

1993 births
Living people
Australian cricketers
Cricket Australia XI cricketers
New South Wales cricketers
Sydney Thunder cricketers
Cricketers from Sydney
Adelaide Strikers cricketers